Rue Montorgueil is a street in the 1st arrondissement and 2nd arrondissement (in the Montorgueil-Saint Denis-Les Halles district) of Paris, France.  Lined with restaurants, cafés, bakeries, fish stores, cheese shops, wine shops, produce stands and flower shops, rue Montorgueil is a place for Parisians to socialize while doing their daily shopping.  At the southernmost tip of rue Montorgueil is Saint-Eustache Church, and Les Halles, containing the largest indoor (mostly underground) shopping mall in central Paris; and to the north is the area known as the Grands Boulevards. While cars are not banned from the street, the priority is for pedestrians who can enjoy the cafes and shops while walking down the cobblestones.

Famous restaurants

 L'Escargot, 38, rue Montorgueil.  Founded in 1875 by restaurateur Mignard.
 Au Rocher de Cancale
 La Maison Stohrer, 51, rue Montorgueil.  This bakery opened its doors in 1730 and is one of the oldest bakeries in Paris.  It was at this location that baba au rhum was invented.

Restaurant districts and streets in France
Montorgueil
Montorgueil